The second and final series of Popstar to Operastar began on 4 June 2011, with eight celebrities in competition to become an opera singer, after achieving success as a popstar. The judges were confirmed; with Rolando Villazón and Katherine Jenkins and two new judges Vanessa-Mae and Simon Callow, who took over the places of Meat Loaf and Laurence Llewelyn-Bowen. Myleene Klass returned as the presenter taking on sole presenting duties as Alan Titchmarsh did not return.

Background 
On 4 August 2010 Group Finance Manager, Ian Griffiths, confirmed at ITV's Interim Results Meeting that Popstar to Operastar had been recommissioned for a second series.

On 12 May 2011, Digital Spy revealed the full line-up for series 2: X Factor winner 2009 Joe McElderry, Ultravox frontman Midge Ure, Toploader's Joe Washbourn, Erasure's Andy Bell, Bucks Fizz's Cheryl Baker, The Pussycat Dolls' Melody Thornton, Steps' Claire Richards and US soul singer Jocelyn Brown.

In the same article it was confirmed that Myleene Klass would present Series 2 alone. Meat Loaf and Laurence Llewellyn-Bowen would be replaced as judges by Simon Callow and Vanessa Mae.

The second series aired on Sundays at 8pm. It began Sunday 5 June 2011, finishing its run on Sunday 10 July 2011.

Popstars

Results summary
Colour key:

 Indicates that the casting vote would lie with that judge if the panel reached a split decision.
 Indicates that the casting vote was required as the panel failed to reach a majority decision

Episodes 

Voting percentages are from ITV.com

 Most Public Votes
 Eliminated
 Bottom two

Week 1 
Performances
Cheryl Baker: "Barcarole (Belle nuit, ô nuit d'amour)" from Tales of Hoffmann by Jacques Offenbach
Joe McElderry: "Una furtiva lagrima" from Gaetano Donizetti
Melody Thornton: "Habanera (L'amour est un oiseau rebelle)" from Carmen by Georges Bizet
Midge Ure: "Questa O Quella" of Rigoletto by Giuseppe Verdi

Did not perform (immune for week 1)
Andy Bell
Jocelyn Brown
Claire Richards
Joseph Washbourn

Bottom two
 Midge Ure - Eliminated on judges tied 2-2, with deciding vote given to Katherine Jenkins to save Melody Thornton
 Melody Thornton

Voting Results
Rolando Villazón and Vanessa-Mae saved Midge Ure. Simon Callow and Katherine Jenkins saved Melody Thornton.

Guest Performers
Katherine Jenkins - "Una Voce Poco Fa" from The Barber of Seville by Gioachino Rossini

Week 2 
Performances
Andy Bell: "'O Sole Mio" by Eduardo di Capua and Giovanni Capurro
Jocelyn Brown: "Chanson Bohème (Les tringles des sistres tintaient)" from Carmen by Georges Bizet
Claire Richards: "O Mio Babbino Caro" from Gianni Schicchi by Giacomo Puccini
Joseph Washbourn: "Toreador Song (Votre toast je peux vous le rendre)" from Carmen by Georges Bizet

Did not perform (immune for week 2)
Cheryl Baker
Joe McElderry
Melody Thornton

Bottom two
 Jocelyn Brown - Eliminated on judges decision 3-1
 Joseph Washbourn

Voting Results
Only Simon Callow voted to save Jocelyn Brown, with remaining three judges saving Joseph Washbourn 

Guest Performers
 Rolando Villazón - "No Puede Sur"

Week 3 
Performances
Cheryl Baker: "Je veux vivre" from Roméo et Juliette by Charles Gounod
Andy Bell: "Non più andrai" from Marriage of Figaro by Mozart
Joe McElderry: "La donna è mobile" from Rigoletto by Giuseppe Verdi
Claire Richards: "Sempre Libera" from La traviata by Giuseppe Verdi
Melody Thornton: "Mon cœur s'ouvre à ta voix" from Samson et Dalila by Camille Saint-Saëns
Joseph Washbourn: "Madamina, il catalogo è questo" from Don Giovanni by Mozart

Bottom two
 Melody Thornton - Eliminated on judges decision 3-1
 Joseph Washbourn

Voting Results
Only Vanessa-Mae voted to save Melody Thornton, with remaining three judges saving Joseph Washbourn 

Guest Performers

 Week 4 
Performances
Cheryl Baker: "Mein Herr Marquis (Adele's Laughing Song)" from Die Fledermaus by Johann Strauss II
Andy Bell: "Largo al factotum" from The Barber of Seville by Rossini
Joe McElderry: "Nessun dorma" from Turandot by Giacomo Puccini
Claire Richards: "Casta Diva" from Norma by Vincenzo Bellini
Joseph Washbourn: "Torna a Surriento" by Giambattista De Curtis and Ernesto De Curtis

Bottom two
 Andy Bell - Eliminated by unanimous vote of the judges 4-0
 Joseph Washbourn

Guest Performers

 Week 5 (Semi Final)
Performances
Cheryl Baker: "Un bel di vedremo" from Madama Butterfly by Giacomo Puccini
Joe McElderry: "Granada" by Agustín Lara
Claire Richards: "Der Holle Rache (The Queen of the Night Aria)" from The Magic Flute by Mozart
Joseph Washbourn: "Fin ch'han dal vino (The Champagne Aria)" from Don Giovanni by Mozart
Cheryl Baker / Joe McElderry (duet): "Canto della Terra" by Francesco Sartori and Lucio Quarantotto
Claire Richards / Joseph Washbourn (duet): Con te partirò by Francesco Sartori and Lucio Quarantotto

Result
 Joseph Washbourn - Eliminated by public after receiving the fewest votes
Claire Richards - Eliminated after finishing third in the public vote

Guest Performers
Alfie Boe - "Who Am I" from Les MisérablesNote: Rolando Villazón was absent as a judge in this episode because of a concert he had in Switzerland. Therefore, Opera tenor, Alfie Boe filled in for him.

 Week 6 (Final)
Performances
Cheryl Baker: "The Flower Duet (Sous le dôme épais)" from Lakmé by Léo Delibes (a duet with Katherine Jenkins) and "Je veux vivre" from Roméo et Juliette'' by Charles Gounod (solo)
Joe McElderry: "Musica proibita" (duet with Rolando Villazón) and "Nessun dorma" by Giacomo Puccini (solo)

Result
 Joe McElderry - Winner by public vote receiving 77.1% of the votes
 Cheryl Baker - Runner-up by public vote receiving 22.9% of the votes

Guest Performers
 Andrea Bocelli

Ratings
Episode Viewing figures from Broadcasters' Audience Research Board (BARB).

Impact
After the show, Joe McElderry signed a record deal with label Decca, and it was announced he was to release an album of classics, to expose his operatic voice. The album was titled 'Classic' and it was released in August 2011 and charted at no.2, the highest chart position for an album Joe has ever released.

References

2011 in British music
2011 British television seasons
Popstar to Operastar